Ciro Verratti (17 August 1907 – 6 July 1971) was an Italian fencer. He won a gold medal in the team foil event at the 1936 Summer Olympics. He was cast as the lead in the 1937 pirate swashbuckler The Black Corsair, his only film role.

References

External links
 
 
 
 

1907 births
1971 deaths
Italian male foil fencers
Olympic fencers of Italy
Fencers at the 1936 Summer Olympics
Olympic gold medalists for Italy
Olympic medalists in fencing
Sportspeople from Chieti
Medalists at the 1936 Summer Olympics
Italian male film actors
20th-century Italian male actors